Hannah Christina Payton (born 23 March 1994) is an English professional racing cyclist, who last rode for UCI Women's Team  in road racing, and Team Kinesis UK in cyclo-cross.

See also
 List of 2016 UCI Women's Teams and riders

References

External links
 

1994 births
Living people
English female cyclists
Sportspeople from Stourbridge